Südtirol Digital Fernsehen (SDF) is an Italian private television channel based in Bolzano, in the autonomous province of South Tyrol. It is the province's only private channel broadcast in German.
SDF is a general interest channel with a focus on hourly news. Local culture and sports also make a significant part of its programming.

The channel's main anchor is Magdalena Steiner, previously with German channel :de:München TV. In 2015, the press reported that veteran Rai Südtirol anchor Jimmy Nussbaumer had privately submitted a plan to defect to SDF and use his professional connections to build the young channel into a direct competitor for his former employer, but his demands – which included a hefty salary and studio upgrades worth €3 million upfront – were deemed excessive.

SDF has an Italian-language sister channel called VB33.

References

External links
 Official website

German-language mass media in South Tyrol
German-language television stations
Mass media in Bolzano
Television channels in Italy
2009 establishments in Italy
Television channels and stations established in 2009